The Girl in the Red Velvet Swing is a 1955 American film directed by Richard Fleischer from a screenplay by Walter Reisch and Charles Brackett, and starring Joan Collins, Ray Milland, and Farley Granger. The CinemaScope film was released by Twentieth Century-Fox, which had originally planned to put Marilyn Monroe in the title role, and then suspended her when she refused to do the film.

Plot
The film relates the fictionalized story of Evelyn Nesbit (Joan Collins). Nesbit was a model and actress who became embroiled in the scandal surrounding the June 1906 murder of her paramour, architect Stanford White (Ray Milland), by her husband, rail and coal tycoon Harry Kendall Thaw (Farley Granger).

Cast
 Ray Milland as Stanford White
 Joan Collins as Evelyn Nesbit Thaw
 Farley Granger as Harry Kendall Thaw
 Luther Adler as Delphin Delmas
 Cornelia Otis Skinner as Mrs. Thaw
 Glenda Farrell as Mrs. Nesbit
 Frances Fuller as Mrs. Elizabeth White
 Phillip Reed as Robert J. Collier
 Gale Robbins as Gwen Arden
 James Lorimer as McCaleb
 John Hoyt as William Travers Jerome
 Robert F. Simon as Stage Manager
 Harvey Stephens as Dr. Hollingshead
 Emile Meyer as Hunchbacher

Production
Writer Walter Reisch claims the film was his idea; he says 20th Century Fox were enthusiastic in part because producer Charlie Brackett knew Stanford White as a boy. Reisch estimates the film was 70% fact and 30% fictionalised. They tracked down Nesbit to get permission to make the film. Nesbit agreed in exchange for money although she was reluctant to do publicity for the film.

See also
Ragtime, a 1975 novel by E. L. Doctorow and a 1981 film also treating the story of Nesbit, Thaw, and White

References

External links

 
 
 
 

1955 crime drama films
1955 romantic drama films
1955 films
CinemaScope films
American biographical films
American crime drama films
American romantic drama films
1950s English-language films
Films directed by Richard Fleischer
Films produced by Charles Brackett
Films set in the 1900s
Films with screenplays by Charles Brackett
20th Century Fox films
Biographical films about actors
1950s American films